The following are lists of Malayalam films of the 1960s by year.

 Malayalam films of 1960
 Malayalam films of 1961
 Malayalam films of 1962
 Malayalam films of 1963
 Malayalam films of 1964
 Malayalam films of 1965
 Malayalam films of 1966
 Malayalam films of 1967
 Malayalam films of 1968
 Malayalam films of 1969

References

Malayalam
Malayalam